Walther is an ancient lunar impact crater located in the southern highland region of the Moon. It is joined along the western rim to the crater Deslandres. To the northeast is Aliacensis, and joined to the southeast rim is the irregular Nonius.

Description
The rim of Walther is complex, heavily eroded and incised by lesser impacts. The wall retains a generally circular form, but many of its features have been worn away and there is a slight protruding bulge in the western rim. The floor has been resurfaced after the original impact, leaving the southwestern half relatively smooth. In the northwest quadrant is an offset central peak that has been worn and impacted by several small craters.

Names
Walther is named after the German astronomer Bernhard Walther. Like many of the craters on the Moon's near side, it was named (in the Latin form, 'Valtherus') by Giovanni Riccioli, whose 1651 nomenclature system has become standardized. Earlier lunar cartographers had given the feature different names: Michael van Langren's 1645 map calls it "Caroli I Reg. Britt.", after King Charles I of England, and Johannes Hevelius grouped it with Purbach and Regiomontanus as "Mons Libanus" after Mount Lebanon.

Satellite craters

By convention these features are identified on lunar maps by placing the letter on the side of the crater midpoint that is closest to Walther.

References

 
 
 
 
 
 
 
 
 
 

Impact craters on the Moon